Something About Cats and Other Pieces is a collection of fantasy, horror and science fiction short stories, poetry and essays by American author H. P. Lovecraft. It was released in 1949 and was the fourth collection of Lovecraft's work published by Arkham House.

The stories for this volume were selected by August Derleth.

Contents

Something About Cats and Other Pieces contains the following tales:

 "A Prefatory Note" by August Derleth
 "The Invisible Monster" by Sonia Greene
 "Four O'Clock" by Sonia Greene
 "The Horror in the Burying Ground" by Hazel Heald
 "The Last Test" by Adolphe de Castro
 "The Electric Executioner" by Adolphe de Castro
 "Satan's Servants" by Robert Bloch. Note: This tale is sometime listed as 'revised' by Lovecraft, as indeed, it was presented here. However, while Lovecraft lent advice on this early tale of Bloch's (which was first written 1935) he does not appear to have written any prose in the story. Lovecraft's notes amounting to a page and half of comments and suggestions are printed here as an appendix.
 "The Despised Pastoral"
 "Time and Space"
 "Merlinus Redivivus"
 "At the Root"
 "The Materialist Today"
 "Vermont: A First Impression"
 "The Battle That Ended the Century"
 "Notes for The Shadow Over Innsmouth"
 "Discarded Draught of The Shadow Over Innsmouth"
 "Notes for At the Mountains of Madness"
 "Notes for The Shadow Out of Time"
 "Phaeton"
 "August"
 "To the American Flag"
 "To a Youth"
 "My Favorite Character"
 "To Templeton and Mount Manadnock"
 "The House"
 "The City"
 "The Po-et's Nightmare"
 "Sir Thomas Tryout"
 "Lament for the Vanished Spider"
 "Regnar Lodbrug's Epicedium"
 "A Memoir of Lovecraft" by Rheinhart Kleiner
 "Howard Phillips Lovecraft" by Samuel Loveman
 "Lovecraft as I Knew Him" by Sonia Greene (as by Sonia H. Davis) 
 "Lovecraft's Sensitivity" by August Derleth
 "Lovecraft's Conservative" by August Derleth
 "The Man Who Was Lovecraft" by E. Hoffmann Price
 "A Literary Copernicus" by Fritz Leiber, Jr.
 "Providence: Two Gentlemen Meet at Midnight" by August Derleth
 "HPL" by Vincent Starrett

Reprints

New York: Books for Libraries Press, 1971.

References

1949 short story collections
Short story collections by H. P. Lovecraft
American poetry collections
Essay collections
Arkham House books